Clement Cheung Wan-ching, GBS, JP (born 17 November 1961) has been the Chief Executive Officer of the Insurance Authority since August 2018. He is a member of the Executive Committee of the International Association of Insurance Supervisors and Chair of its Audit and Risk Committee, as well as Chairman of the Asian Forum of Insurance Regulators.  

Cheung is a former Secretary for the Civil Service of Hong Kong and a former Commissioner of Customs and Excise.

Background
Cheung joined Hong Kong Civil Service in 1983 and served various roles within the government including member of Executive and Legislative Councils, Civil Service Bureau, Food and Health Bureau, Housing Department, and Handover Ceremony Co-ordination Office. In 1998, he became the director of Hong Kong Economic and Trade Office.  By 2001, Cheung promoted to Deputy Secretary for Works, then Commissioner of Insurance in 2006. In 2009, he became Postmaster General of Hong Kong. Cheung was appointed as Commissioner of Customs and Excise in 2011. Before retiring from the administrative service, he was Secretary for the Civil Service.

References

Living people
Government officials of Hong Kong
Hong Kong civil servants
1962 births
Recipients of the Gold Bauhinia Star